This is a list of years in Philippine television.

21st century

20th century

See also
 List of years in television

Television
Television in the Philippines by year
Philippine